The 2012–13 Women's EHF Cup was the 32nd edition of the competition, running from 13 October 2012 to May 2013.

Team Tvis Holstebro defeated Metz Handball in the final overcoming a home 4-goals loss to win its first international trophy and the third win for Denmark in four years. Metz, which defeated the previous season's runner-up HC Zalău in the semifinals, was the first French team to reach the competition's final since 1993.

First qualifying round

Second qualifying round

Round of 16

Quarter-finals

Semifinals

Final

References

Women's EHF Cup
EHF Cup Women
EHF Cup Women